The 2010–11 Football League is the second division of the Greek professional football system and the first season under the name Football League after previously being known as Beta Ethniki. Its regular season began on 12 September 2010 and ended on 15 May 2011; the promotion play-offs, originally scheduled to take place immediately afterwards, were postponed to late July 2011 in wake of the Koriopolis scandal.

Teams
A total of three teams gained promotion to the 2010–11 Super League after the 2009–10 Beta Ethniki season. Champions Olympiacos Volos and runners-up Kerkyra were directly promoted, while the remaining spot was taken by promotion play-off group winners Panserraikos. The three promoted teams were replaced by Levadiakos, PAS Giannina and Panthrakikos, who finished in the bottom three places of the 2009–10 Super League.

On the bottom end of the table, Rodos, Kalamata and Egaleo were relegated to the 2010–11 Football League 2, the former Gamma Ethniki. Kalamata and Egaleo were directly relegated after finishing in the bottom two places of the table, while Rodos finished bottom in the relegation play-off group. The relegated teams were replaced by 2009–10 Gamma Ethniki South champions Kallithea, North champions Veria and promotion play-off match winners Trikala.

League table

Results

Play-offs
A number of teams were scheduled to take part in two different double round-robin tournaments after the conclusion of the regular season, with four teams to compete for the third available promotion spot and four teams to avoid relegation. However, the relegation play-offs were cancelled after several teams were demoted because of financial irregularities.

Each play-off participant was assigned a number of bonus points in relation to their result of the regular season. The worst-placed team of each group started the play-off with 0 points. The number of points earned during the regular season by these teams was then subtracted from the points of each other team of the respective group; the result was divided by four and rounded to the nearest whole number of points, if necessary.

Promotion play-offs
The promotion play-offs initially comprised the teams ranked 3rd through 6th during the regular season, OFI, Trikala, Levadiakos and Doxa Drama and were scheduled to take place in late May, immediately after the conclusion of the regular season. However, the round was postponed due to the investigations in the Koriopolis scandal. Trikala were eventually found guilty of forgery and demoted to the amateur leagues; their spot in the promotion play-off was taken by 7th-placed Diagoras.

As outlined above, Diagoras' earned total of 52 points during the regular season were taken as a base for the calculation of bonus points for the other play-off participants. OFI had collected 69 points, 17 more than Diagoras Rodos, and hence were assigned a four-point bonus. Similarly, Levadiakos (60 points) were awarded two bonus points and Doxa Drama (56 points) were given a one-point bonus. OFI won the play-off and were promoted to 2011–12 Super League Greece. Levadiakos and Doxa Drama were also promoted because Olympiakos Volou and Kavala F.C. were relegated because of Koriopolis.

Relegation play-offs
The relegation play-offs initially comprised the teams ranked 13th through 16th during the regular season, Ionikos, Ilioupoli, Thrasyvoulos and Ethnikos Piraeus and were scheduled to take place in late May, immediately after the conclusion of the regular season. However, the round was eventually cancelled after Trikala, Anagennisi Karditsa, Ionikos and Asteras Piraeus were all found guilty of forgery and demoted from the league.

Top scorers
''Source: Soccerway

References

Second level Greek football league seasons
Greece
2